Zaarvlaas is a hamlet in the municipality of Gemert-Bakel, North Brabant province of the Netherlands.

Zaarvlaas is not a statistical entity, and the postal authorities have placed it under Bakel. It has no place name signs and consists of a handful of houses.

It was first mentioned in 1897 as Zaarvlaas, and means "sedge grass (carex) near a pond in the heath or forest".

References

Populated places in North Brabant
Gemert-Bakel